Alejandro Davidovich Fokina (born 5 June 1999) is a Spanish professional tennis player. He has a career-high ATP singles ranking of World No. 25 achieved on 20 March 2023 and a career-high doubles ranking of World No. 213 achieved on 17 May 2021.

Early life
Davidovich Fokina was born and raised in La Cala del Moral, Rincón de la Victoria, about 10 km away from Málaga, Spain, to a Swedish-Russian father Eduard Mark Davidovich, and a Russian mother Tatiana Fokina. His father is a former boxer. Davidovich Fokina has a brother, Mark. He began playing tennis with his father at the age of three. When he turned five, he started training at Calaflores and later Serramar tennis courts with coach Manolo Rubiales.

Since 2009, Jorge Aguirre has been his coach.

Junior career
Davidovich Fokina was Spanish Champion at U12, U15 and U18 levels. He started his professional tennis career in 2016. He won his first ITF Grade 1 in Canada at the Repentigny Internationaux de Tennis Junior, defeating Félix Auger-Aliassime in the semifinal, and Liam Caruana in the final. In October, he won his first doubles title in a Futures tournament held in Nigeria partnering French player Alexis Klégou. During 2017, as a junior, he made his ATP debut at the Barcelona Open Banc Sabadell in April thanks to a qualifying wild card. He defeated Roberto Carballés Baena in three sets. He lost in the second round of qualifying to Santiago Giraldo in three sets. He also reached the junior Roland Garros semifinals, losing to Alexei Popyrin in straight sets. 

He defeated Rudolf Molleker in the first round and won the 2017 Wimbledon boys' singles title without dropping a set, winning the final against Argentine Axel Geller.

Professional career

2018: First Challenger final
In 2018, he was the hitting partner for the  Spanish Davis Cup team at the tie Spain vs. Great Britain held at Marbella. In March, Davidovich won his first ITF Futures 15K title at Quinta do Lago in Portugal, defeating Roberto Ortega Olmedo. He started playing the ATP Challenger Tour during the season.

He received his first qualifying wildcard for ATP Masters 1000 at Madrid where he lost against Taylor Fritz. At the ATP Lisbon Challenger in May, he defeated Alex de Minaur in the first round. He then lost to Christian Harrison in the second. In the second round of Wimbledon qualifying, he lost to Peter Polansky. 

In September, Davidovich reached his first ATP Challenger final in Poland after defeating Molleker in the semifinal. He lost the final against Guido Andreozzi in three sets. During his Asian tour, he reached the quarterfinals at the Liuzhou Challenger and the semifinals at the Shenzhen Challenger.

2019: Two Challenger titles
Davidovich Fokina started the season playing the first round of Australian Open qualifying by defeating Daniel Gimeno Traver. 

He reached the quarterfinals at the Chennai Challenger and the final at the Bangkok Challenger II, which he lost to James Duckworth. He made the semifinals at the Marbella Challenger on his home soil, losing to Pablo Andújar in three sets. 

He played his first ATP main draw match, losing in the first round of the Grand Prix Hassan II to Philipp Kohlschreiber after winning two qualifying matches. Later in the month, he reached the semifinals of the 2019 Estoril Open as a qualifier, beating Gaël Monfils and Taylor Fritz along the way.

He entered in the main draw of his first Grand Slam at the 2019 French Open as a lucky loser.

Later in the year, he finally won his first ATP Challenger title, defeating Jaume Munar to win the Seville Challenger. Just a month after that triumph, he won his second Challenger title in Liuzhou, defeating Denis Istomin in the final.

2020: First ATP doubles title, US Open fourth round
In 2020, Davidovich Fokina reached the second round of a Grand Slam for the first time at the 2020 Australian Open. He beat Norbert Gombos in a 5-set epic before falling to Diego Schwartzman.

He won his first ATP title in doubles at the 2020 Chile Open in Santiago, partnering with fellow Spaniard Roberto Carballés Baena, where they defeated  2nd seeded pair Marcelo Arévalo/Jonny O'Mara in the final.

He reached the second round of the 2020 French Open for the first time by defeating wildcard Harold Mayot before losing to 13th seed Andrey Rublev.

At the 2020 US Open, Davidovich Fokina reached the fourth round of a Grand Slam for the first time in his career, beating Dennis Novak, Hubert Hurkacz, and Cameron Norrie, before losing in straight sets to Alexander Zverev. In Cologne 1, he reached the semifinals, beating qualifier Emil Ruusuvuori, 8th seed Marin Cilic, and Dennis Novak before losing to eventual champion and top seed Alexander Zverev in straight sets. 

He got his first Masters victory against 11th seed Karen Khachanov at the 2020 Paris Masters in 3 sets. He also beat wildcard Benjamin Bonzi in straight sets before being crushed by 6th seed Diego Schwartzman 6–1, 6–1.

2021: French Open quarterfinal, Top 35 and Olympics debut 

Davidovich Fokina missed the Australian Open after testing positive for COVID-19. He started his season in February by playing at the Quimper Challenger. As the top seed, he retired during his first-round match against Thomas Fabbiano due to an ankle injury. As the top seed in Biella, he fell in the second round to Federico Gaio. At the Open Sud de France, he beat fourth seed Hubert Hurkacz in the second round. He lost in the quarterfinals to Egor Gerasimov. Playing at the Rotterdam Open, he was defeated in the second round by qualifier and eventual finalist, Márton Fucsovics. After Rotterdam, he competed at the Open 13 in Marseille. Seeded seventh, he was eliminated in the second round by French qualifier Arthur Rinderknech. At the Dubai Championships, he was beaten in the second round by 14th seed Filip Krajinović.

Davidovich Fokina started his clay-court season at the first edition of the Andalucía Open in Marbella, Spain. Seeded fifth, he lost in the second round to Ilya Ivashka. He had a great run at the Monte-Carlo Masters. He started the tournament by beating Alex de Minaur in the first round. He then got his first Top ten victory by defeating eighth seed and World N0. 10 Matteo Berrettini, in the second round. In the third round, he won over French wildcard Lucas Pouille to reach his first ATP Masters 1000 quarter-final. He retired after losing the first set during his quarterfinals match against fourth seed Stefanos Tsitsipas due to a left quadricep injury. Due to his great result in Monte-Carlo, his ranking improved from 58 to 48. In Barcelona, he fell in the first round to Alexander Bublik. Seeded eighth at the Estoril Open, he made it to the semifinals where he was defeated by seventh seed, compatriot, and eventual champion, Albert Ramos Viñolas. At the Madrid Open, he defeated French qualifier Pierre-Hugues Herbert in the first round in three long sets. He was eliminated in the second round by second seed Daniil Medvedev. Getting past qualifying at the Italian Open, he reached the third round where he was beaten by top seed and five-time champion, Novak Djokovic. Ranked 46 at the French Open, he stunned 15th seed Casper Ruud in his third-round match to reach his second fourth round Grand Slam appearance. He then beat Federico Delbonis to reach his first Grand Slam quarterfinal. He ended up losing his quarterfinals match to sixth seed Alexander Zverev.

Seeded sixth at the Eastbourne International, Davidovich Fokina retired after losing the first set during his second-round match against Vasek Pospisil due to a lower back injury. Seeded 30th at Wimbledon, he fell in the first round to American Denis Kudla.

Representing Spain at the Summer Olympics, Davidovich Fokina lost in the third round to top seed Novak Djokovic.

2022: Maiden Tour & Masters 1000 final & top 30 debut
At the Monte Carlo Masters, Davidovich Fokina recorded the biggest victory of his career by defeating world No. 1 Novak Djokovic in the second round. He progressed to the quarterfinals for the second year in a row by defeating David Goffin in the third round, then defeated Taylor Fritz and Grigor Dimitrov to reach his maiden career singles final. He became the first man to reach his maiden career final at a Masters tournament since Filip Krajinović in the 2017 Paris Masters. He then lost to Stefanos Tsitsipas. As a result he reached the top 30 at world No. 27 on 18 April 2022.

He recorded his first win at the 2022 Wimbledon Championships defeating top-10 player and 7th seed Hubert Hurkacz in a tight 3 1/2 hours five set match with a super tiebreak in the fifth  after missing three match points. He lost his second round match to Jiri Vesely after being handed a second code violation and point penalty for ball-abuse on match point in the fifth set super tiebreak, after hitting the ball out of the court, in a nearly four hours marathon on court.

At the US Open, Davidovich Fokina lost in the fourth round to Matteo Berrettini in five sets after twisting his knee in the fifth set.

2023: Masters quarterfinal at Indian Wells & top 25 debut 
At the 2023 BNP Paribas Open he reached the quarterfinals of a Masters 1000 for a third time in his career defeating wildcard Yibing Wu, 13th seed Karen Khachanov and qualifier Cristian Garin. As a result he made his top 25 debut in the rankings on 20 March 2023.

Playing style
Davidovich Fokina is known for having one of the best drop shots on the ATP Tour. His playing style could generally be described as aggressive, and his level tends to fluctuate over the course of a match. He also frequently deploys an undearm serve. Although he is not the tallest of players, he makes up for this disadvantage with his quick movement and powerful groundstrokes. Additionally, Davidovich Fokina can often be seen diving on courts of all surfaces, which leads to both wildly entertaining shotmaking and occasionally injury. He is also known for his excellent returns, often finding sharp angles.

Significant finals

ATP Masters 1000 finals

Singles: 1 (1 runner-up)

ATP career finals

Singles: 1 (1 runner-up)

Doubles: 1 (1 title)

Challenger and Futures finals

Singles: 9 (3–6)

Doubles: 2 (1–1)

Performance timelines

Singles
Current through the 2023 Dubai Tennis Championships.

Record against top 10 players
Davidovich Fokina's record against players who have been ranked in the top 10, with those who are active in boldface. Only ATP Tour main draw matches are considered:

Top 10 wins
Davidovich Fokina has a  record against players who were ranked in the top 10 at the time the match was played.

Junior Grand Slam finals

Singles: 1 (1 title)

References

External links

 
 
 
 
 
 

1999 births
Living people
Spanish male tennis players
Sportspeople from Málaga
Wimbledon junior champions
Spanish people of Swedish descent
Tennis players from Andalusia
Grand Slam (tennis) champions in boys' singles
Olympic tennis players of Spain
Tennis players at the 2020 Summer Olympics
Spanish people of Russian descent